Miss America 1970, the 43rd Miss America pageant, was held at the Boardwalk Hall in Atlantic City, New Jersey on September 6, 1969.

First runner-up Kathy Baumann became an actress, guest-starring in several television series, including a featured role in the January 5, 1974 episode of M*A*S*H. Second runner-up Susan Anton also became a successful actress and singer.

Results

Placements

Order of announcements

Top 10

Top 5

Awards

Preliminary awards

Other awards

Delegates

Judges
 Hal David
 Joan Crosby
 Wendell E. Smith
 Leon Leonidoff
 Zelma George
 Jane Pickens Langley
 Edward Loeb
 Norton Mockridge
 Mrs. Walter Varney Magee
 Bud Westmore

References

External links
 1970 Miss America pageant - held in September, 1969.

1970
1969 in the United States
1969 in New Jersey
September 1969 events in the United States
Events in Atlantic City, New Jersey